Shetland is a constituency of the Scottish Parliament (Holyrood) covering the council area of Shetland. It elects one Member of the Scottish Parliament (MSP) by the first past the post method of election. It is also one of eight constituencies in the Highlands and Islands electoral region, which elects seven additional members, in addition to the eight constituency MSPs, to produce a form of proportional representation for the region as a whole.

Shetland has been held by the Liberal Democrats at all elections since the formation of the Scottish Parliament in 1999, with the current MSP being Beatrice Wishart, who won the seat at a 2019 by-election held following the resignation of former party leader Tavish Scott.

Electoral region 

Shetland is part of the Highlands and Islands electoral region; the other seven constituencies of are Argyll and Bute, Caithness, Sutherland and Ross, Inverness and Nairn, Moray, Na h-Eileanan an Iar, Orkney and Skye, Lochaber and Badenoch.

The region covers most of Argyll and Bute council area, all of the Highland council area, most of the Moray council area, all of the Orkney Islands council area, all of the Shetland Islands council area and all of Na h-Eileanan Siar.

Constituency boundaries and council area 

The Shetland constituency was created at the same time as the Scottish Parliament, in 1999, to cover the Shetland Isles council area. The constituency is protected in law due to its geographical separation from other parts of Scotland, and therefore its boundaries are not subject to review. 
In the House of Commons of the British Parliament at (Westminster), the council area is covered by the Orkney and Shetland constituency, which also covers the Orkney Islands council area.

It contains all seven of the Shetland Council wards: North Isles; Shetland North; Shetland West; Shetland Central; Shetland South; Lerwick North; Lerwick South.

Member of the Scottish Parliament 
The seat was represented by Tavish Scott, former Scottish Liberal Democrats leader, from the 1999 election until he stood down in June 2019. The subsequent by-election was won by Beatrice Wishart, who held the seat for the Liberal Democrats.

Election results

2020s

2010s

2000s

1990s

Notes

External links

Constituencies of the Scottish Parliament
1999 establishments in Scotland
Constituencies established in 1999
Politics of Shetland
Scottish Parliament constituencies and regions 1999–2011
Scottish Parliament constituencies and regions from 2011
Lerwick